MF Prevelis is a Ro-Pax ferry, built in 1980 by Imabari Shipbuilding in Japan as Ferry Orange II for Shikoku Kaihatsu Ferry (ja). On 27 December 1980 she was put into service on the Toyo(ja) - Osaka route. In 1994, she was bought by Rethymniaki Naftiliaki SA and was named after Preveli Monastery. Following a refit in Perama, she started to operate on the Piraeus - Rethymno route. After the 1999 acquisition of Rethymniaki by ANEK Lines, Prevelis operates in the colors of ANEK.

Route
As of 2019, MF Prevelis connects Piraeus with Cyclades, Crete and Dodecanese, calling at the ports of Milos, Santorini, Anafi, Heraklion, Sitia, Kasos, Karpathos, Halki and Rhodes.

External links
M/S Ferry Orange no 2
 ΕΓ/ΟΓ Πρέβελης «Ο αφανής ήρωας της άγονης γραμμής της Κασοκαρπαθίας»

References

Ships of ANEK Lines
Ships built in Japan
1980 ships